Number Two, No. 2, or similar may refer to:

Film
 No. 2 (film), a 2006 New Zealand film
 No. 2: Original Motion Picture Soundtrack, the soundtrack to the film
 Number Two (film), a 1975 film directed by Jean-Luc Godard
 Jackass Number Two, 2006

Characters
 Number Two (The Prisoner), a character from the British television series The Prisoner
 Number Two (Battlestar Galactica) or Leoben Conoy, a character from the 2004 TV series
 Numbuh Two, a character from the animated television series Codename: Kids Next Door
 Number 2, a character in the Austin Powers series of films
 Number two, a character from The Hitchhiker's Guide to the Galaxy by Douglas Adams

Music
Bands and artists
 No. 2 (band), an American alternative rock band
 Paul Gray (American musician) (1972–2010), who used the pseudonym #2

Albums
 N° 2, a 1959 Serge Gainsbourg album
 #2 (Thees Uhlmann album), 2013

Songs
 "Number 2" (song), a 2021 song by KSI
 "Number Two", a 2008 song by They Might Be Giants from the album Here Come the 123s
 "Number Two", a 2012 song by My Chemical Romance from the album Conventional Weapons

Other uses
 2 (number), the natural number
 (To go) number 2, a slang term for defecation
 No. 2 fuel oil or No. 2 diesel fuel
 "Number two", a term for a curveball in baseball

See also 
 2 (disambiguation)